Choriceras tricorne is a species of plants under the family Picrodendraceae and one of two species in the genus Choriceras. It is found in Southern New Guinea and Australia.

See also
Taxonomy of the Picrodendraceae

References

Picrodendraceae
Flora of Australia
Flora of New Guinea
Plants described in 1873